Afidnes railway station (Sidirodromikos Stathmos Afidnon)  is a station on the Piraeus–Platy railway line in Afidnes, in the northern part of the Athens urban area, in the municipality of Oropos, Greece. It was inaugurated on 8 March 1904 and reopened on 6 May 2005. It is owned by OSE, however services are provided by Hellenic Train through the Athens Suburban Railway from Athens to Chalcis. The station was featured in a 1974 episode of the YENED Greek soap opera Border Station (Μεθοριακός Σταθμός).

History
The Station opened on 8 March 1904 as Kiourka railway station, in what was then the Central Greece on what was a branch line of the Piraeus, Demerli & Frontiers Railway. The name reflects the older name for the area. After the station opened, a new settlement arose near it named Stathmos Afidnon ("Afidnes station"). In 1920 the station and most of the standard gauge railways in Greece came under the control of the Hellenic State Railways (SEK). During the Axis occupation of Greece (1941–44), Athens was controlled by the German military, and the line was used for the transport of troops and weapons. During the occupation (and especially during German withdrawal in 1944), the network was severely damaged by both the German army and Greek resistance groups. The track and rolling stock replacement took time following the civil war, with normal service levels resumed around 1948. In 1970 OSE became the legal successor to the SEK, taking over responsibilities for most of Greece's rail infrastructure. On 1 January 1971, the station and most of the Greek rail infrastructure were transferred to the Hellenic Railways Organisation S.A., a state-owned corporation. In 1974 episode of the YENED Greek soap opera Border Station (Μεθοριακός Σταθμός) was filmed at Afidnes railway station. The line was converted to diesel sometime before 1990. Freight traffic declined sharply when the state-imposed monopoly of OSE for the transport of agricultural products and fertilisers ended in the early 1990s. Many small stations of the network with little passenger traffic were closed down.

In 2001 the infrastructure element of OSE was created, known as GAIAOSE, it would henceforth be responsible for the maintenance of stations, bridges and other elements of the network, as well as the leasing and the sale of railway assists. In 2003, OSE launched "Proastiakos SA", as a subsidiary to serve the operation of the suburban network in the urban complex of Athens during the 2004 Olympic Games. In 2005, TrainOSE was created as a brand within OSE to concentrate on rail services and passenger interface. In 2008, all Athens Suburban Railway services were transferred from OSE to TrainOSE.

The station was reopened on 6 May 2005. In 2009, with the Greek debt crisis unfolding OSE's Management was forced to reduce services across the network. Timetables were cutback and routes closed, as the government-run entity attempted to reduce overheads. In 2017 OSE's passenger transport sector was privatised as TrainOSE, currently (as of 2023) a wholly-owned subsidiary of Ferrovie dello Stato Italiane infrastructure, including stations, remained under the control of OSE. That same year on 30 July, Line 3 of the Athens Suburban Railway began serving the station.

Facilities
The ground-level station is assessed via stairs or a ramp. It has 1 side platform and two island platforms, with the main station buildings located on the eastbound platform; these are, however, now inaccessible and partially rundown, with access to the platforms via stairs or lifts. The Station is housed in the original stone-built station (Now closed). There is no cafe on-site; however, there is a restaurant next door, 'Manáras'. At platform level, both platforms have sheltered seating and Dot-matrix display departure and arrival screens and timetable poster boards. There is a large car park next to the westbound platforms. There are no bus connections at the station.

Services
Since 15 May 2022, the following weekday services call at this station:

Station layout

Gallery

See also
Railway stations in Greece
Hellenic Railways Organization
Hellenic Train
Proastiakos

References

External links
 Agios Stefanos railway station - National Railway Network Greek Travel Pages

Oropos
Attica
Buildings and structures in Attica
Transport in Attica
Railway stations in Attica
Railway stations opened in 1904
Railway stations opened in 2005